Benexate (BEX) is an anti-ulcer agent used in the treatment of acid-related disorders. It is unique in its inability to form salts that are both non-bitter and soluble.

Medical uses 
Benexate is approved from treatment of gastric ulcer in Japan.

Mechanism of action 
The mechanism of action of benexate involves promotion of prostaglandin synthesis, protein secretion, and blood flow stimulation in the gastrointestinal tract.

See also
 Famotidine
 Powder diffraction
 Sugar substitute
 Crystal engineering

References

Further reading
 

Drugs acting on the gastrointestinal system and metabolism
Guanidines
Salicylate esters
Salicylyl esters
Cyclohexanes